USS Qui Vive (SP-1004) was a United States Navy patrol vessel in commission from 1917 to 1919. She served as a hospital boat for part of her naval career.

Qui Vive was built in 1916 by Hutchinson Brothers at Alexandria, New York, for Houston Barnard of Rochester, New York. On 22 June 1917, the U.S. Navy chartered her from Barnard at Alexandria Bay, New York, for use as a section patrol boat during World War I, and she was commissioned as USS Qui Vive (SP-1004) in 1917.

Assigned to the 5th Naval District, Qui Vive served on patrol duties until late in 1917. On 3 December 1917, she was reassigned to duty as a hospital boat at Norfolk, Virginia.

Qui Vive was decommissioned at Norfolk on 6 May 1919 and was returned to Barnard on 27 May or 7 June 1919.

Notes

References
 
 Department of the Navy Naval History and Heritage Command Online Library of Selected Images: Civilian Ships: Qui Vive (American Motor Boat, 1916). Served as USS Qui Vive (SP-1004) in 1917-1919
 NavSource Online: Section Patrol Craft Photo Archive Qui Vive (SP 1004)

Patrol vessels of the United States Navy
World War I patrol vessels of the United States
Hospital ships of the United States Navy
World War I auxiliary ships of the United States
Ships built in New York (state)
1916 ships